The 2012 Quebec general election took place in the Canadian province of Quebec on September 4, 2012. Lieutenant Governor Pierre Duchesne dissolved the National Assembly on August 1, 2012, following Premier Jean Charest's request. The Parti Québécois were elected to a minority government, with Pauline Marois becoming the first woman to be Premier of Quebec. The Quebec Liberal Party took second place, with Premier Jean Charest losing his seat. The newly formed party Coalition Avenir Québec led by François Legault took third place, while Québec solidaire took 2 seats out of the 125.

It was the first time since 2007 (and only the third time in Quebec history) that a minority government would be formed, as no party won an absolute majority of the seats. Both the PQ and Liberal vote declined which boosted support for the CAQ and Quebec Solidaire.

During Marois' victory speech, an attack including gunshots and a fire occurred at the Métropolis concert hall housing the event and a forty-year-old man died as a result of gunshot wounds.

Timeline

2008
December 8 – 39th Quebec general election
December 15 – Pauline Marois becomes the leader of the Official Opposition.
December 18 – Swearing in of the Cabinet members

2009
January 13 – Yvon Vallières is elected President of the National Assembly.
January 14 – An economic statement is pronounced by Monique Jérôme-Forget.
March 6 – Resignation of Mario Dumont (ADQ) as MNA of Rivière-du-Loup
March 10 – The opening speech of the 39th Quebec Legislature is pronounced by Premier Jean Charest.
March 25 — The Conservative Party of Quebec is registered.
April 8 – Resignation of Monique Jérôme-Forget (Lib) as MNA of Marguerite-Bourgeoys
April 9 — The Parti nul is registered.
June 22 – In two by-elections, Jean D'Amour (Lib) and Clément Gignac (Lib) are elected MNAs of Rivière-du-Loup and Marguerite-Bourgeoys respectively.
June 25 – Resignation of François Legault (PQ) as MNA of Rousseau
September 21 – In a by-election, Nicolas Marceau (PQ) is elected MNA of Rousseau with 57% of the vote.
October 18 – Gilles Taillon is elected as leader of the Action démocratique du Québec (ADQ).
November 6 – Éric Caire and Marc Picard leave the ADQ to sit as independents.
November 10 – Gilles Taillon resigns his post as ADQ leader amid Caire and Picard's defections. Taillon also called for a police investigation into the “troubling” funding practices in the party."
November 19 – Gérard Deltell replaces Taillon as leader of ADQ.

2010
January 6 – Resignation of Camil Bouchard (PQ) as MNA of Vachon
May 6 – Tony Tomassi is kicked out of the Liberal cabinet and caucus after it is revealed he was given a gasoline credit card by a private security firm.
July 5 – In a by-election, Martine Ouellet (PQ) is elected MNA of Vachon with 59% of the vote.
August 9 – Resignation of Jacques Dupuis (Lib) as MNA of Saint-Laurent
September 7 – Resignation of Claude Béchard as MNA of Kamouraska-Témiscouata (Lib), he dies from cancer later that day
September 13 – In a by-election, Jean-Marc Fournier (Lib) is elected MNA of Saint-Laurent with 64% of the vote.
November 29 – In a by-election, André Simard (PQ) is elected MNA of Kamouraska-Témiscouata with 37% of the vote.

2011
March 7 — A party named "Québec - Révolution démocratique" is registered.
June 6 – Louise Beaudoin, Pierre Curzi, and Lisette Lapointe leave the Parti Québécois to sit as independents.
June 7 – Jean-Martin Aussant leaves the Parti Québécois to sit as an independent.
June 21 – Benoit Charette leaves the Parti Québécois to sit as an independent and René Gauvreau is asked to leave the Parti Québécois pending an investigation of his former aide.
September 6 – Resignation of Nathalie Normandeau (Lib) as MNA of Bonaventure
September 19 – Jean-Martin Aussant (Ind, ex-PQ) announces his intention to register a new sovereigntist political party, Option nationale.
November 4 – Coalition Avenir Québec, a new party led by François Legault, is officially registered.
November 17 – Lisette Lapointe buys an Option nationale membership, but remains sitting as an independent.
November 24 – Daniel Ratthé is expelled from the PQ caucus.
December 5 – In a by-election, Damien Arsenault (Lib) is elected MNA of Bonaventure with 49.5% of the vote.
December 14 – The Coalition Avenir Québec and the ADQ announced an agreement in principle to merge, pending final approval from the ADQ membership.
December 16 – Resignation of David Whissell (Lib) as MNA of Argenteuil
December 19 – Éric Caire (Ind, ex-ADQ), Benoit Charette (Ind, ex-PQ), Marc Picard (Ind, ex-ADQ), and Daniel Ratthé (Ind, ex-PQ) join the Coalition Avenir Québec.

2012

January 9 – François Rebello (PQ) joins the Coalition Avenir Québec.
January 22 – The ADQ membership approves a merger with the Coalition Avenir Québec, resulting in ADQ MNA's Sylvie Roy, Janvier Grondin, François Bonnardel and leader Gérard Deltell becoming CAQ members.
February 14 — The Coalition Avenir Québec is registered.
February 25 – Founding convention of Option nationale.
March 4 – Independent Lisette Lapointe announces that she will not run in the next election.
March 21 — The Équipe autonomiste is registered.
April 3 - Louise Beaudoin (Ind) rejoins the Parti Québécois.
April 5 - René Gauvreau (Ind) is re-admitted into the Parti Québécois.
May 3 - Resignation of Tony Tomassi (Ind) as MNA of LaFontaine
May 8 — The Middle Class Party of Quebec is registered.
May 14 - Resignation of Line Beauchamp (Lib) as MNA of Bourassa-Sauvé
June 11 - In by-elections, Marc Tanguay (Lib) is elected MNA of LaFontaine with 53% of the vote, and Roland Richer (PQ) is elected MNA of Argenteuil with 36% of the vote.
June 13 — The Coalition pour la constituante is registered.
June 29 — The Parti démocratie chrétienne du Québec is renamed to Parti unité nationale.
July 11 — Documents from the Quebec Liberal Party and the Government suggest that a general election will be called on August 1 and take place on Tuesday, September 4.
July 13 — The Quebec Citizens' Union is registered.
August 1 - Lieutenant Governor Pierre Duchesne dissolves the National Assembly, on Premier Jean Charest's request, and calls an election for September 4, 2012.
September 4 - The election takes place.
Pauline Marois's victory speech is disrupted by the 2012 Montreal shooting.

Incumbent MNAs who did not run for re-election

Liberal
Vincent Auclair, Vimont
Daniel Bernard, Rouyn-Noranda–Témiscamingue
Michelle Courchesne, Fabre
Monique Gagnon-Tremblay, Saint-François
Johanne Gonthier, Mégantic-Compton
Norman MacMillan, Papineau
Yvon Vallières, Richmond

Parti Québécois
Louise Beaudoin, Rosemont
Danielle Doyer, Matapédia
René Gauvreau, Groulx
Martin Lemay, Sainte-Marie–Saint-Jacques
Claude Pinard, Saint-Maurice
Sylvain Simard, Richelieu
Guillaume Tremblay, Masson

Coalition Avenir Québec
Janvier Grondin, Beauce-Nord

Independent
Pierre Curzi, Borduas
Lisette Lapointe, Crémazie

Results

|- style="background-color:#CCCCCC;"
! rowspan="2" colspan="2" style="text-align:left;" | Party
! rowspan="2" style="text-align:left;" | Party leader
! rowspan="2" style="font-size:80%;" | Candidates
! colspan="5" style="text-align:center;" | Seats
! colspan="3" style="text-align:center;" | Popular vote
|- style="background-color:#CCCCCC;text-align:center;"
| 2008
| style="font-size:80%;" | Dissol.
| 2012
| style="font-size:80%;" | Change
| %
| style="font-size:80%;" | Number
| %
| style="font-size:80%;" | Change (pp)

| style="text-align:left;" | Pauline Marois
| 125
| 51
| 47
| 54
| +3
| 43.20
| 1,393,703
| 31.95
| -3.22

| style="text-align:left;" | Jean Charest
| 125
| 66
| 64
| 50
| -16
| 40.00
| 1,360,968
| 31.20
| -10.88

| style="text-align:left;" | François Legault
| 125
| 7†
| 9
| 19
| +12†
| 15.20
| 1,180,235
| 27.05
| +10.68†

| style="text-align:left;" | Françoise David, Amir Khadir††
| 124
| 1
| 1
| 2
| +1
| 1.60
| 263,111
| 6.03
| +2.25

| style="text-align:left;" | Jean-Martin Aussant
| 120
| *
| 1
| —
| *
| —
| 82,539
| 1.89
| *

| style="text-align:left;" | Claude Sabourin
| 66
| —
| —
| —
| —
| —
| 43,394
| 0.99
| -1.18

| colspan="2" style="text-align:left;" | Independent
| 46
| —
| 1
| —
| —
| —
| 11,578
| 0.27
| +0.07

| style="text-align:left;" | Luc Harvey
| 27
| *
| —
| —
| *
| —
| 7,654
| 0.18
| *

| style="text-align:left;" | Marc Fafard
| 29
| *
| —
| —
| *
| —
| 5,197
| 0.12
| *

| style="text-align:left;" | Renaud Blais
| 10
| *
| —
| —
| *
| —
| 2,743
| 0.06
| *

| style="text-align:left;" | Guy Boivin
| 17
| *
| —
| —
| *
| —
| 2,182
| 0.05
| *

| style="text-align:left;" | Alexis St-Gelais
| 20
| *
| —
| —
| *
| —
| 2,089
| 0.05
| *

| style="text-align:left;" | Jean Lavoie
| 7
| *
| —
| —
| *
| —
| 2,053
| 0.05
| *

| style="text-align:left;" | Pierre Chénier
| 25
| —
| —
| —
| —
| —
| 1,969
| 0.05
| -0.03

| style="text-align:left;" | Michel Lepage
| 10
| —
| —
| —
| —
| —
| 1,244
| 0.03
| -0.10

| style="text-align:left;" | Paul Biron
| 12
| *
| —
| —
| *
| —
| 1,227
| 0.03
| *

| style="text-align:left;" | Hugô St-Onge
| 2
| *
| —
| —
| *
| —
| 420
| 0.01
| *

| style="text-align:left;" | Robert Genesse
| 1
| *
| —
| —
| *
| —
| 256
| 0.01
| *

| style="text-align:left;" | Yvan Rodrigue
| 1
| *
| —
| —
| *
| —
| 126
| 0.00
| *

| colspan="3" style="text-align:left;" | Independent Option nationale
| *
| 1
| colspan="6" |

| colspan="4" style="text-align:left;" | Vacant
| 1
| colspan="6" |
|- style="background-color:#e9e9e9;"
| colspan="3" style="text-align:left;" | Total
| 892
| 125
| 125
| 125
| 0
| 100.00%
| 4,362,688
| 100.00
| 
|-
| colspan="9" style="text-align:left;" | Valid ballots
| 4,362,688
| 98.78
| +0.28
|-
| colspan="9" style="text-align:left;" | Rejected ballots
| 53,749
| 1.22
| -0.28
|-
| colspan="9" style="text-align:left;" | Voter turnout
| 4,416,437
| 74.60
| +17.17
|-
| colspan="9" style="text-align:left;" | Registered electors
| 5,919,778
| colspan="2" |
|}
Notes:
† Results change is compared to the Action démocratique du Québec in 2008.
†† The party avoids formally designating David and Khadir as co-leaders, relying instead on internal direct democracy during general assembly meetings; the de jure leader recognized by the Chief Electoral Officer of Quebec (DGE) is Régent Séguin.
* Party did not nominate candidates in the previous election.

 Results change is compared to the Action démocratique du Québec in 2008.

Opinion polls

List of candidates
The deadline for candidacies was August 18, 2012 at 2 pm.
 Official Search page for candidates, by party or by electoral division (monvote.qc.ca, a website of the Chief Electoral Officer of Quebec)

(1) Bas-Saint-Laurent and (11) Gaspésie–Îles-de-la-Madeleine

|-
|bgcolor=whitesmoke|Bonaventure
|
|Damien Arsenault
||
|Sylvain Roy
|
|Jean-Marc Landry
|
|Patricia Chartier
|
|Louis-Patrick St-Pierre
|
|
||
|Damien Arsenault
|-
|bgcolor=whitesmoke|Côte-du-Sud
||
|Norbert Morin
|
|André Simard
|
|François Lagacé
|
|Josée Michaud
|
|Marc-André Robert
|
|Serge Lévesque (ÉA)
||
|Norbert MorinMontmagny-L'Islet
|-
|bgcolor=whitesmoke|Gaspé
|
|Georges Mamelonet
||
|Gaétan Lelièvre
|
|Yvan Blanchard
|
|Éric Boucher
|
|Frédérick DeRoy
|
|
||
|Georges Mamelonet
|-
|bgcolor=whitesmoke|Îles-de-la-Madeleine
|
|Germain Chevarie
||
|Jeannine Richard
|
|Georges Painchaud
|
|Yvonne Langford
|
|Jonathan Godin
|
|
||
|Germain Chevarie
|-
|rowspan=3 bgcolor=whitesmoke|Matane-Matapédia
|rowspan=3|
|rowspan=3|Jean-Clément Ouellet
| rowspan=3|
|rowspan=3|Pascal Bérubé
|rowspan=3|
|rowspan=3|Pierre d'Amours
|rowspan=3|
|rowspan=3|Diane Bélanger
|rowspan=3|
|rowspan=3|Geneviève Allard
|rowspan=3|
|rowspan=3|Lise Deschênes (Green)
Pascal Gauthier (ÉA)
||
|Pascal BérubéMatane
|-
|colspan=2|merged district
|-
||
|Danielle DoyerMatapédia
|-
|bgcolor=whitesmoke|Rimouski
|
|Raymond Giguère
||
|Irvin Pelletier
|
|Jean-Paul Carrier
|
|Rosalie Carrier Cyr
|
|Pierre Beaudoin
|
|Clément Pelletier (Green)
Renaud Blais (PN)
||
|Irvin Pelletier
|-
|rowspan=3 bgcolor=whitesmoke|Rivière-du-Loup–Témiscouata
|rowspan=3 |
|rowspan=3|Jean D'Amour
|rowspan=3|
|rowspan=3|Michel Lagacé
|rowspan=3|
|rowspan=3|Gaétan Lavoie
|rowspan=3|
|rowspan=3|Stacy Larouche
|rowspan=3|
|rowspan=3|Jonathan St-Pierre
|rowspan=3|
|rowspan=3|Nadia Pelletier (Green)
Sylvain Potvin (CC)
||
|Jean D'AmourRivière-du-Loup
|-
|colspan=2|merged district
|-
||
|André SimardKamouraska-Témiscouata
|}

(2) Saguenay–Lac-Saint-Jean and (9) Côte-Nord

|-
|bgcolor=whitesmoke|Chicoutimi
|
|Carol Néron
||
|Stéphane Bédard
|
|Alix Boivin
|
|Pierre Dostie
|
|Catherine Bouchard-Tremblay
|
|Simon Lavoie (PCM)
||
|Stéphane Bédard
|-
|bgcolor=whitesmoke|Dubuc
|
|Serge Simard
||
|Jean-Marie Claveau
|
|François Tremblay
|
|Marie Francine Bienvenue
|
|David Girard
|
|Charles-Olivier B. Tremblay (Ind.)
Pascal Tremblay (Ind.)
||
|Serge Simard
|-
|bgcolor=whitesmoke|Duplessis
|
|Lise Pelletier
||
|Lorraine Richard
|
|Gervais Gagné
|
|Jacques Gélineau
|
|Yan Rivard
|
|Marc Fafard (CC)
Alain Magnan (Ind.)
||
|Lorraine Richard
|-
|bgcolor=whitesmoke|Jonquière
|
|Martine Girard
||
|Sylvain Gaudreault
|
|Pierre-Olivier Simard
|
|Réjean Dumais
|
|Sébastien Lévesque
|
|Alexis St-Gelais (QCU)
Alain Létourneau (PN)
Tommy Gagnon (Ind.)
||
|Sylvain Gaudreault
|-
|bgcolor=whitesmoke|Lac-Saint-Jean
|
|Jeannot Boulianne
||
|Alexandre Cloutier
|
|Michel Simard
|
|Frédérick Plamondon
|
|Jordan Racine
|
|France Bergeron (Green)
Matthew Babin (BP)
||
|Alexandre Cloutier
|-
|bgcolor=whitesmoke|René-Lévesque
|
|Pascal Chouinard
||
|Marjolain Dufour
|
|Dereck Blouin-Perry
|
|Julie Gonthier-Brazeau
|
|Maxime Cantin
|
|
||
|Marjolain Dufour
|-
|bgcolor=whitesmoke|Roberval
|
|Georges Simard
||
|Denis Trottier
|
|Alain Hamel
|
|Olivier Bouchard-Lamontagne
|
|Catherine Douesnard
|
|
||
|Denis Trottier
|}

(3) Capitale-Nationale

|-
|bgcolor=whitesmoke|Charlesbourg
|
|Michel Pigeon
|
|Christophe Fortier Guay
||
|Denise Trudel
|
|Marie Céline Domingue
|
|Guillaume Cyr
|
|Pierre Chénier (ML)
Yves Marier (ÉA)
Daniel Lachance (PUN)
Jérôme Paquin (PN)
Alain Pérusse (Ind.)
||
|Michel Pigeon
|-
|bgcolor=whitesmoke|Charlevoix–Côte-de-Beaupré
|
|Claire Rémillard
||
|Pauline Marois
|
|Ian Latrémouille
|
|André Jacob
|
|Pierre Tremblay
|
|Daniel Laforest (CC)
||
|Pauline MaroisCharlevoix
|-
|bgcolor=whitesmoke|Chauveau
|
|Marie-Ève Picard-Bédard
|
|Marie-Ève D’Ascola
||
|Gérard Deltell
|
|Sébastien Bouchard
|
|Ariane Grondin
|
|Gaétan Roy (PC)
Noémie Rocque (QCU)
Normand Michaud (ÉA)
Sylvain Rancourt (PCM)
||
|Gérard Deltell
|-
|bgcolor=whitesmoke|Jean-Lesage
||
|André Drolet
|
|Pierre Châteauvert
|
|Johanne Lapointe
|
|Élaine Hémond
|
|Christian St-Pierre
|
|Claude Moreau (ML)
Simon Beaudoin (QCU)
Steve Nadeau (ÉA)
Oxana Vassiltchenko (PUN)
Debelle Michel (Ind.)
||
|André Drolet
|-
|bgcolor=whitesmoke|Jean-Talon
||
|Yves Bolduc
|
|Neko Likongo
|
|Hugues Beaulieu
|
|Émilie Guimond-Bélanger
|
|Guillaume Langlois
|
|Stéphane Pouleur (ÉA)
||
|Yves Bolduc
|-
|bgcolor=whitesmoke|La Peltrie
|
|Jean-François Gosselin
|
|Jean-Luc Jolivet
||
|Éric Caire
|
|Brigitte Hannequin
|
|Alexandre Desmeules
|
|Charlotte Cyr (ÉA)
Anthony Leclerc (Ind.)
||
|Éric Caire
|-
|bgcolor=whitesmoke|Louis-Hébert
||
|Sam Hamad
|
|Rosette Côté
|
|Michel Hamel
|
|Guillaume Boivin
|
|Sol Zanetti
|
|Guillaume Dion (CC)
Véronique Durand (PC)
Maxime Guérin (QCU)
Hugues Fortin (ÉA)
Julie Lachance (PN)
||
|Sam Hamad
|-
|bgcolor=whitesmoke|Montmorency
|
|Raymond Bernier
|
|Michel Létourneau
||
|Michelyne St-Laurent
| 
|Lucie Charbonneau
|
|Jean Bouchard
|
|Maryse Belley (ÉA)
Luc Duranleau (PI)
Jean Lavoie (PCM)
Martin Roussel (Ind.)
||
|Raymond Bernier
|-
|bgcolor=whitesmoke|Portneuf
|
|Michel Matte
|
|René Perreault
||
|Jacques Marcotte
|
|Raphaël Langevin
|
|Marianne Garnier
|
|Sylvie Gagné (PC)
Yves St-Amant (Ind.)
||
|Michel Matte
|-
|bgcolor=whitesmoke|Taschereau
|
|Clément Gignac
||
|Agnès Maltais
|
|Mario Asselin
|
|Serge Roy
|
|Catherine Dorion
|
|François Tremblay (CC)
Guy Boivin (ÉA)
Jean-Luc Savard (PN)
||
|Agnès Maltais
|-
|bgcolor=whitesmoke|Vanier-Les Rivières
|
|Patrick Huot
|
|Marc Dean
||
|Sylvain Lévesque
|
|Monique Voisine
|
|Mathieu Fillion
|
|Jean Cloutier (Green)
Daniel Brisson (PC)
Jean-François Morency (ÉA)
Carl Côté (Ind.)
||
|Patrick HuotVanier
|}

(4) Mauricie

|-
|bgcolor=whitesmoke|Champlain
|
|Marc-Antoine Trudel
||
|Noëlla Champagne
|
|Pierre Jackson
|
|Yves Sansregret
|
|Émilie Joly
|
|Jessy Trottier (ÉA)
Éric L'Abbée (Ind.)
||
|Noëlla Champagne
|-
|bgcolor=whitesmoke|Laviolette
||
|Julie Boulet
|
|André Beaudoin
|
|Sylvain Medzalabenleth
|
|Jean-François Dubois
|
|Gabriel Pelland
|
|Jean-Paul Bédard (ML)
Jean Marceau (Ind.)
||
|Julie Boulet
|-
|bgcolor=whitesmoke|Maskinongé
||
|Jean-Paul Diamond
|
|Patrick Lahaie
|
|Jean Damphousse
|
|Julie Veilleux
|
|Émilie Viau-Drouin
|
|Laurence J. Requilé (Green)
Marie Anny Gosselin (CC)
Didier Provencher (ÉA)
Linda Delmé (PCM)
||
|Jean-Paul Diamond
|-
|bgcolor=whitesmoke|Saint-Maurice
|
|Robert Pilotte
||
|Luc Trudel
|
|Pierre Giguère
|
|Luc Lafrance
|
|Nathalie Lortie
|
|Gilles Noël (PUN)
Marie-Paule Bertrand (Ind.)
||
|Claude Pinard
|-
|bgcolor=whitesmoke|Trois-Rivières
||
|Danielle St-Amand
|
|Djemila Benhabib
|
|Andrew D'Amours
|
|Jean-Claude Landry
|
|Charles-Hugo Normand
|
|Kathie Mc Nicoll (ÉA)
Robert Deschamps (Ind.)
||
|Danielle St-Amand
|}

(5) Estrie (Eastern Townships)

|-
|bgcolor=whitesmoke|Mégantic
||
|Ghislain Bolduc
|
|Gloriane Blais
|
|Raymonde Lapointe
|
|William Leclerc Bellavance
|
|Jasmin Roy-Rouleau
|
|Jacques Audet (Ind.)
Jean-Luc Perron (Ind.)
||
|Johanne GonthierMégantic-Compton
|-
|bgcolor=whitesmoke|Orford
||
|Pierre Reid
|
|Michel Breton
|
|Jean L'Écuyer
|
|Patricia Tremblay
|
|Marie-Hélène Martin
|
|Guillaume Corriveau (Green)
Serge Trottier (CC)
||
|Pierre Reid
|-
|bgcolor=whitesmoke|Richmond
||
|Karine Vallières
|
|Étienne-Alexis Boucher
|
|Marie-Soleil Perron
|
|Colombe Landry
|
|Jean-Sébastien Lamothe
|
|Nick Fonda (Green)
Danielle Voisard (CC)
||
|Yvon Vallières
|-
|bgcolor=whitesmoke|Saint-François
|
|Nathalie Goguen
||
|Réjean Hébert
|
|Éric Giroux
|
|André Poulin
|
|Gaby Machabée
|
|Lindsay-Jane Gowman (Green)
Lionel Lambert (PUN)
||
|Monique Gagnon-Tremblay
|-
|bgcolor=whitesmoke|Sherbrooke
|
|Jean Charest
||
|Serge Cardin
|
|Philippe Girard
|
|Christian Bibeau
|
|Évelyne Beaudin
|
|Suzanne Richer (Green)
Christian Clavet (PI)
||
|Jean Charest
|}

(6) Montreal

East

|-
|bgcolor=whitesmoke|Anjou–Louis-Riel
||
|Lise Thériault
|
|Martine Roux
| 
|Richard Campeau
|
|Marlène Lessard
|
|Raphaël Couture
|
|Samuel Stohl (CC)
Linda Sullivan (ML)
||
|Lise ThériaultAnjou
|-
|bgcolor=whitesmoke|Bourassa-Sauvé
||
|Rita de Santis
|
|Marianne Dessureault
|
|Louis Pelletier
|
|Will Prosper
|
|Nancy Lavallée
|
|Éric Guerra-Grenier Jr. (Green)
|colspan=2|vacant
|-
|bgcolor=whitesmoke|Bourget
|
|Dave McMahon
||
|Maka Kotto
|
|Mario Bentrovato
|
|Patrice Gagnon
|
|Paolo Zambito
|
|Gilbert Caron (Green)
Jan Stohl (CC)
Claude Brunelle (ML)
Gaston Savard (PUN)
Sylvie R. Tremblay (PI)
||
|Maka Kotto
|-
|bgcolor=whitesmoke|Crémazie
|
|Eleni Bakopanos
||
|Diane De Courcy
|
|Carla El-Ghandour
|
|André Frappier
|
|Yanek Lauzière-Fillion
|
|Yves Laporte (Green)
||
|Lisette Lapointe
|-
|bgcolor=whitesmoke|Gouin
|
|Anson Duran
|
|Nicolas Girard
|
|Bernard Labadie
|| 
|Françoise David
|
|
|
|Sameer Muldeen (Green)
Gilles Guibord (PUN)
||
|Nicolas Girard
|-
|bgcolor=whitesmoke|Hochelaga-Maisonneuve
|
|Alexandre Farley
||
|Carole Poirier
|
|David Monette
|
|Alexandre Leduc
|
|André Lamy
|
|Nicholas Kulak (Green)
Jean-François Jetté (CC)
Christine Dandenault (ML)
Serge Provost (PI)
Denis Poulin (PN)
||
|Carole Poirier
|-
|bgcolor=whitesmoke|Jeanne-Mance–Viger
||
|Filomena Rotiroti
|
|Nicolas Bonami
|
|Jean-François Gagné
|
|Marie-Chantal Locas
|
|Julie Surprenant
|
|Garnet Colly (ML)
||
|Filomena Rotiroti
|-
|bgcolor=whitesmoke|LaFontaine
||
|Marc Tanguay
|
|Marc Boulerice
|
|Domenico Cavaliere
|
|Christine Filiatrault
|
|Maxime St-Arnault
|
|Gaëtan Bérard (Green)
Patrice Raza (PC)
Steven Hombrados (QCU)
||
|Marc Tanguay
|-
|bgcolor=whitesmoke|Laurier-Dorion
||
|Gerry Sklavounos
10,987
34.08%
|
|Badiona Bazin
8,524
26.44%
|
|Marie Josée Godbout
3,154
9.78%
|
|Andrés Fontecilla
7,844
24.33%
|
|Miguel Tremblay
912
2.83%
|
|Danny Polifroni (Green) 480 1.49%
Yves Pageau (CC) 66 0.20%
Peter Macrisopoulos (ML) 100 0.31%
David H. Cherniak (Ind.) 119 0.37%
Michel Dugré (Ind./nd) 50 0.16%
||
|Gerry Sklavounos
|-
|bgcolor=whitesmoke|Mercier
|
|Anne Pâquet
|
|Jean Poirier
|
|Julie Boncompain
||
|Amir Khadir
|
|Nicolas Payne
|
|David Kovacs (Green)
||
|Amir Khadir
|-
|bgcolor=whitesmoke|Pointe-aux-Trembles
|
|Jessica Cialdella
||
|Nicole Léger
|
|Guy Boutin
|
|Natacha Larocque
|	
|Guillaume Simard L'Heureux
|
|Geneviève Royer (ML)
Gérald Briand (PI)
Jean-Marcel Seck (Ind.)
||
|Nicole Léger
|-
|bgcolor=whitesmoke|Rosemont
|
|Madwa-Nika Phanord-Cadet
||
|Jean-François Lisée
|
|Léo Fradette
|
|François Saillant
|
|Johanne Lavoie
|
|Daniel Guersan (CC)
Stéphane Chénier (ML)
Raynald St-Onge (BP)
||
|Louise Beaudoin
|-
|bgcolor=whitesmoke|Sainte-Marie–Saint-Jacques
|
|Étienne Collins
||
|Daniel Breton
|
|Cédrick Beauregard
|
|Manon Massé
|
|Denis Monière
|
|Serge Lachapelle (ML)
Edson Emilio (QCU)
Louis Provencher (PCM)
Jean-Marc Labrèche (Ind.)
Dimitri Mourkes (Ind.)
||
|Martin Lemay
|-
|bgcolor=whitesmoke|Viau
||
|Emmanuel Dubourg
|
|Gabriel Arbieto Munayco
|
|Walid Hadid
|
|Geneviève Fortier-Moreau
|
|Simon-Pierre Bélanger
|
|Eric Perreault-Chamberland (Green)
||
|Emmanuel Dubourg
|}

West

|-
|bgcolor=whitesmoke|Acadie
||
|Christine St-Pierre
|
|Rachid Bandou
|
|Abel-Claude Arslanian
|
|Marianne Breton-Fontaine
|
|Sébastien Croteau
|
|
||
|Christine St-Pierre
|-
|bgcolor=whitesmoke|D'Arcy-McGee
||
|Lawrence Bergman
|
|Guy Amyot
|
|Sophie Leroux
| 
|Émilie Beauchesne
|
|
|
|Abraham Weizfeld (Ind.)
||
|Lawrence Bergman
|-
|bgcolor=whitesmoke|Jacques-Cartier
||
|Geoffrey Kelley
|
|Olivier Gendreau
|
|Paola L. Hawa
|
|François-Xavier Charlebois
|
|Raphael Hébert
|
|Alex Tyrrell (Green)
Ágnes Mina Barti (QCU)
Francis Juneau (Ind.)
||
|Geoffrey Kelley
|-
|bgcolor=whitesmoke|Marguerite-Bourgeoys
||
|Robert Poëti
|
|Jessica Riggi
|
|Michel Delisle
|
|Yebo Romaric Okou
|
|Véronique Pelletier
|
|Yves Le Seigle (ML)
||
|Clément Gignac
|-
|bgcolor=whitesmoke|Marquette
||
|François Ouimet
|
|Étienne Gougoux
|
|Victor A. Tan
|
|Claudelle Cyr
|
|Patrick Valois
|
|John Symon (Green)
||
|François Ouimet
|-
|bgcolor=whitesmoke|Mont-Royal
||
|Pierre Arcand
|
|André Normandeau
|
|Stefan Stanczykowski
|
|Marc-André Beauchamp
|
|Guillaume Blanchet
|
|Ken McMurray (Green)
Amal Bouchentouf (CC)
Diane Johnston (ML)
||
|Pierre Arcand
|-
|bgcolor=whitesmoke|Nelligan
||
|Yolande James
|
|Marcos Archambault
|
|Philippe Boileau
|
|Elahé Machouf
|
|François Landry
|
|Kristianne Brunet (Green)
Jean-Dominic Lévesque-René (QCU)
||
|Yolande James
|-
|bgcolor=whitesmoke|Notre-Dame-de-Grâce
||
|Kathleen Weil
|
|Olivier Sirard
|
|Angely Pacis
|
|David Mandel
|
|Sylvain Labranche
|
|Claude Sabourin (Green)
Rachel Hoffman (ML)
||
|Kathleen Weil
|-
|bgcolor=whitesmoke|Outremont
||
|Raymond Bachand
|
|Roxanne Gendron
|
|Claude Michaud
|
|Édith Laperle
|
|Luc Séguin
|
|Olga Sharonova (CC)
Jonathan Moffatt (QCU)
Mathieu Marcil (PN)
||
|Raymond Bachand
|-
|bgcolor=whitesmoke|Robert-Baldwin
||
|Pierre Marsan
|
|Alexandre Pagé-Chassé
|
|Toni Rinow
|
|Sarah Landry
|
|Sophie Turcot
|
|Mathieu Mireault (Green)
Fredrick-Anthony Ghali (QCU)
||
|Pierre Marsan
|-
|bgcolor=whitesmoke|Saint-Henri–Sainte-Anne
||
|Marguerite Blais
|
|Sophie Stanké
|
|Joakim Beaupré
|
|Nicolas Boisclair
|
|Luc Lefebvre
|
|Andrzej Jastrzebski (PUN)
||
|Marguerite Blais
|-
|bgcolor=whitesmoke|Saint-Laurent
||
|Jean-Marc Fournier
|
|Roger Gagnon
|
|George Manolikakis
|
|Marie Josèphe Pigeon
|
|Maxime Bellerose
|
|Pierre Etienne Loignon (Green)
Fernand Deschamps (ML)
Brian Jenkins (PUN)
||
|Jean-Marc Fournier
|-
|bgcolor=whitesmoke|Verdun
||
|Henri-François Gautrin
|
|Thierry St-Cyr
|
|André Besner
|
|Chantale Michaud
|
|Marc-Antoine Daneau
|
|Jeffrey Mackie (Green)
Eileen Studd (ML)
Philippe Refghi (QCU)
||
|Henri-François Gautrin
|-
|bgcolor=whitesmoke|Westmount–Saint-Louis
||
|Jacques Chagnon
|
|Marc-André Bahl
|
|Johnny Kairouz
|
|Mélissa Desjardins
|
|Benoît Guérin
|
|Lisa Julie Cahn (Green)
Pierre JC Allard (Ind./nd)
||
|Jacques Chagnon
|}

(7) Outaouais

|-
|bgcolor=whitesmoke|Chapleau
||
|Marc Carrière
|
|Yves Morin
|
|Luc Angers
|
|Benoit Renaud
|
|Eid Harb
|
|Jonathan Meijer (Green)
Pierre Soublière (ML)
||
|Marc Carrière
|-
|bgcolor=whitesmoke|Gatineau
||
|Stéphanie Vallée
|
|Maude Tremblay
|
|Michel Halloran
|
|Francis Da Silva-Casimiro
|
|Nicolas Lepage
|
|Brandon Bolduc (Green)
Yvon Breton (ML)
||
|Stéphanie Vallée
|-
|bgcolor=whitesmoke|Hull
||
|Maryse Gaudreault
|
|Gilles Aubé
|
|Étienne Boulrice
|
|Bill Clennett
|
|Mikaël St-Louis
|
|Jozyam Ilsa Fontaine (Green)
Gabriel Girard Bernier (ML)
Kamal Maghri (QCU)
Marc Fiset (PN)
||
|Maryse Gaudreault
|-
|bgcolor=whitesmoke|Papineau
||
|Alexandre Iracà
|
|Jean-François Primeau
|
|Chantal Dubé
|
|Katia Gagnon
|
|Jonathan Beauchamp
|
|Alexandre Deschênes (ML)
Christine Gagné (PN)
Mario Parent (Ind.)
||
|Norman MacMillan
|-
|bgcolor=whitesmoke|Pontiac
||
|Charlotte L'Écuyer
|
|Geneviève Gendron-Nadeau
|
|André Laframboise
|
|Charmain Levy
|
|Patrick Émard
|
|Garry Bélair (Green)
Louis Lang (ML)
||
|Charlotte L'Écuyer
|}

(8) Abitibi-Témiscamingue and (10) Nord-du-Québec

|-
|bgcolor=whitesmoke|Abitibi-Est
|
|Pierre Corbeil
7,653
||
|Élizabeth Larouche
8,430
|
|Samuel Dupras
4,059
|
|Sarah Charbonneau-Beaulieu
1,047
|
|Richard Trudel
452
|
|Yvette Poucachiche (Green)
316
||
|Pierre Corbeil
|-
|bgcolor=whitesmoke|Abitibi-Ouest
|
|Claude Nelson Morin
4,399
||
|François Gendron
12,066
|
|Sébastien D'Astous
4,759
|
|Ghislaine Camirand
1,260
|
|Grégory Vézeau
997
|
|
||
|François Gendron
|-
|bgcolor=whitesmoke|Rouyn-Noranda–Témiscamingue
|
|Melissa Turgeon
7,983
||
|Gilles Chapadeau
11,082
|
|Bernard Flebus
7,140
|
|Guy Leclerc
2,941
|
|Sébastien-L. Pageon
534
|
|Robert Bertrand (Green)
451
||
|Daniel Bernard
|}

|-
|bgcolor=whitesmoke|Ungava
|
|Gérald Lemoyne
3,701
||
|Luc Ferland
4,854
|
|Stéphane Robichaud
1,176
|
|Sylvain Couture
655
|
|Dominic Hamelin-Johnston
277
|
|
||
|Luc Ferland
|}

(12) Chaudière-Appalaches and (17) Centre-du-Québec

|-
|bgcolor=whitesmoke|Arthabaska
|
|Claude Bachand
|
|Lucie LeBrun
||
|Sylvie Roy
|
|Christine Letendre
|
|Rémi Marineau
|
|François Fillion (Green)
Eric Lafontaine (QCU)
Jean Landry (Ind.)
||
|Claude Bachand
|-
|bgcolor=whitesmoke|Beauce-Nord
|
|Jack Roy
|
|Daniel Bizier
||
|André Spénard
|
|Yv Bonnier Viger
|
|Stéphane Trudel
|
|Gwendoline Mathieu-Poulin (Green)
Danielle Favreau (CC)
Sébastien Drouin (PC)
Benoît Roy (Ind.)
||
|Janvier Grondin
|-
|bgcolor=whitesmoke|Beauce-Sud
||
|Robert Dutil
|
|Luc Villeneuve
|
|Richard Savoie
|
|Marie-Claude Verville
|
|Vanessa Roy 
|
|Robert Genesse (QRD)
Jean Rhéaume (Ind.)
||
|Robert Dutil
|-
|bgcolor=whitesmoke|Bellechasse
||
|Dominique Vien
|
|Clément Pouliot
|
|Christian Lévesque
|
|Benoit Comeau
|
|
|
|Linda Beaudoin (PC)
Sébastien Ruel (ÉA)
Christine Lavoie (PUN)
Patrice Aubin (PCM)
||
|Dominique Vien
|-
|bgcolor=whitesmoke|Chutes-de-la-Chaudière
|
|Réal St-Laurent
|
|Daniel Lachance
||
|Marc Picard
|
|Eveline Gueppe
|
|
|
|Marielle Parent (Green)
Renaud Grégoire (PC)
||
|Marc Picard
|-
|bgcolor=whitesmoke|Drummond–Bois-Francs
|
|Marie Désilets
|
|Annie Jean
||
|Sébastien Schneeberger
|
|Francis Soulard
|
|Martin Allard
|
|François Picard (PC)
Robert Dufour (PUN)
Pierre Hébert (Ind.)
||
|Yves-François BlanchetDrummond
|-
|bgcolor=whitesmoke|Johnson
|
|Nancy Boyce
||
|Yves-François Blanchet
|
|Stéphane Legault
|
|Julie Dionne
|
|Steve Lemay
|
|Benoit Lussier (PC)
||
|Étienne-Alexis Boucher
|-
|bgcolor=whitesmoke|Lévis
|
|Gilles Lehouillier
|
|Stéphane Labrie
||
|Christian Dubé
|
|Valérie Guilloteau
|
|Nathaly Dufour
|
|Luc Harvey (PC)
Carl Michaud (ÉA)
Paul Biron (PUN)
Patrick Vallières (PCM)
Yvan Rodrigue (PÉ)
||
|Gilles Lehouillier
|-
|rowspan=3 bgcolor=whitesmoke|Lotbinière-Frontenac
|rowspan=3 |
|rowspan=3|Laurent Lessard
|rowspan=3|
|rowspan=3|Kaven Mathieu
|rowspan=3|
|rowspan=3|Martin Caron
|rowspan=3|
|rowspan=3|Marie-Christine Rochefort
|rowspan=3|
|rowspan=3|
|rowspan=3|
|rowspan=3|
||
|Sylvie RoyLotbinière
|-
|colspan=2|merged district
|-
||
|Laurent LessardFrontenac
|-
|bgcolor=whitesmoke|Nicolet-Bécancour
|
|Marc Descôteaux
|
|Gilles Mayrand
||
|Donald Martel
|
|none
|
|Jean-Martin Aussant
|
|Mathieu Benoit (PC)
||
|Jean-Martin AussantNicolet-Yamaska
|}

(13) Laval

|-
|bgcolor=whitesmoke|Chomedey
||
|Guy Ouellette
|
|Jean Cooke
|
|Marielle Potvin
|
|Francine Bellerose
|
|Patrick Simard
|
|Stéphanie Stevenson (Green)
Kamal Germanos Lutfi (Ind.)
||
|Guy Ouellette
|-
|bgcolor=whitesmoke|Fabre
||
|Gilles Ouimet
|
|François-Gycelain Rocque
|
|Dominique Anglade
|
|Wilfried Cordeau
|
|Bruno Forget
|
|Jean-François Lepage (Green)
Philippe Mayrand (Ind.)
||
|Michelle Courchesne
|-
|bgcolor=whitesmoke|Laval-des-Rapides
|
|Alain Paquet
||
|Léo Bureau-Blouin
|
|Maud Cohen
|
|Sylvie Des Rochers
|
|Lawrence Côté-Collins
|
|Carl Desmarais (Green)
Monique Chartrand (CC)
||
|Alain Paquet
|-
|bgcolor=whitesmoke|Mille-Îles
||
|Francine Charbonneau
|
|Robert Carrier
|
|Jean Prud’homme
|
|Nicole Bellerose
|
|Alain Sénécal
|
|Henrico Negro (Green)
Carlos Silva (QCU)
Régent Millette (Ind.)
||
|Francine Charbonneau
|-
|bgcolor=whitesmoke|Sainte-Rose
|
|Geneviève April
||
|Suzanne Proulx
|
|François Gaudreau
|
|Nicolas Chatel-Launay
|
|Sylvain Fortin 
|
|Ioan-Adrian Hancu (Ind.)
|colspan=2|new district
|-
|bgcolor=whitesmoke|Vimont
||
|Jean Rousselle
|
|Linda Tousignant
|
|Christopher Skeete
|
|David Lanneville
|
|Catherine Houbart
|
|Alain Robert (PC)
Jean-Marc Boyer (Ind.)
||
|Vincent Auclair
|}

(14) Lanaudière

|-
|bgcolor=whitesmoke|Berthier
|
|Catherine Haulard
||
|André Villeneuve
|
|François Benjamin
|
|Louise Beaudry
|
|Raymond Guay
|
|Dany Ouellet (Green)
Pierre Baril (CC)
||
|André Villeneuve
|-
|bgcolor=whitesmoke|Joliette
|
|Pascal Beaupré
||
|Véronique Hivon
|
|Normand Masse
|
|Flavie Trudel
|
|Amélie Dolbec
|
|Mikey Colangelo Lauzon (PC)
Michel Thouin (QCU)
Jean-Mathieu Desmarais (Ind.)
||
|Véronique Hivon
|-
|bgcolor=whitesmoke|L'Assomption
|
|Lise Hébert
|
|Lizabel Nitoi
||
|François Legault
|
|Sylvain Fournier
|
|Evelyne Marcil
|
|Christine Lebel (Green)
||
|Scott McKay
|-
|bgcolor=whitesmoke|Masson
|
|Suzanne Rathé
||
|Diane Hamelin
|
|Christian Gauthier
|
|Jacinthe Sabourin
|
|Samuel Bergeron
|
|Michel Paulette (Green)
Adam Stohl (CC)
||
|Guillaume Tremblay
|-
|bgcolor=whitesmoke|Repentigny
|
|Marc Thompson
||
|Scott McKay
|
|Chantal Longpré
|
|Olivier Huard
|
|Anne-Marie Labrosse
|
|
|colspan=2|new district
|-
|bgcolor=whitesmoke|Rousseau
|
|Mario Racette
||
|Nicolas Marceau
|
|Laurence R. Fortin
|
|François Lépine
|
|Gilles Chapdelaine
|
|André Matteau (PI)
Robert Boucher (Ind.)
||
|Nicolas Marceau
|-
|bgcolor=whitesmoke|Terrebonne
|
|Josée Gingras
||
|Mathieu Traversy
|
|Gaétan Barrette
|
|Yan Smith
|
|Marc-André Dénommée
|
|Benoit Carignan (Green)
Patrick Dubé (CC)
||
|Mathieu Traversy
|}

(15) Laurentides

|-
|bgcolor=whitesmoke|Argenteuil
|
|Lise Proulx
||
|Roland Richer
|
|Mario Laframboise
|
|Yvan Zanetti
|
|Patrick Sabourin
|
|Stephen Matthews (Green)
||
|Roland Richer
|-
|bgcolor=whitesmoke|Bertrand
|
|Yannick Ouellette
||
|Claude Cousineau
|
|Jean-Marc Lacoste
|
|Lise Boivin
|
|Samuelle Ducrocq-Henry
|
|Marc Saint-Germain (Green)
Patrick Dubé (CC)
||
|Claude Cousineau
|-
|bgcolor=whitesmoke|Blainville
|
|Joao Neves
|
|Bernard Généreux
||
|Daniel Ratthé
|
|Étienne Ferland
|
|Christian Bélanger
|
|Michel Sigouin (Green)
Yan Bégin (PI)
||
|Daniel Ratthé
|-
|bgcolor=whitesmoke|Deux-Montagnes
|
|Stéphanie Ménard
||
|Daniel Goyer
|
|Benoit Charette
|
|Normand Godon
|
|Wilson Ortiz
|
|Princess Brooks (Green)
||
|Benoit Charette
|-
|bgcolor=whitesmoke|Groulx
|
|Linda Lapointe
|
|Raymond Archambault
||
|Hélène Daneault
|
|Sylvie Giguère
|
|Alain Marginean
|
|Alec Ware (Green)
Alex Munteanu (Ind.)
||
|René Gauvreau
|-
|bgcolor=whitesmoke|Labelle
|
|Vicki Emard
||
|Sylvain Pagé
|
|Robert Milot
|
|Normand St-Amour
|
|Simon Marcil
|
|François Beauchamp (Green)
||
|Sylvain Pagé
|-
|bgcolor=whitesmoke|Mirabel
|
|Ismaël Boisvert
||
|Denise Beaudoin
|
|Sylvie D'Amours
|
|Mylène Jaccoud
|
|Jean-François Pouliot
|
|Eric Emond (Ind.)
||
|Denise Beaudoin
|-
|bgcolor=whitesmoke|Saint-Jérôme
|
|Marc Bustamante
|
|Gilles Robert
||
|Jacques Duchesneau
|
|Vincent Lemay-Thivierge
|
|Julien Benca
|
|Olivier Adam (Green)
||
|Gilles RobertPrévost
|}

(16) Montérégie

Eastern

|-
|bgcolor=whitesmoke|Borduas
|
|Conrad Deschênes
||
|Pierre Duchesne
|
|Emmanuelle Géhin
|
|Jean-François Lessard
|
|Martin Dulac
|
|Mary Harper (Green)
Michel Lepage (PI)
||
|Pierre Curzi
|-
|bgcolor=whitesmoke|Brome-Missisquoi
||
|Pierre Paradis
|
|Richard Leclerc
|
|Benoit Legault
|
|Benoit Van Caloen
|
|Patrick Melchior
|
|Louise Martineau (Green)
Dominique Favreau (CC)
Jacques Pipon (PC)
Gilles Alarie (Ind.)
Jean-Pierre Dufault (Ind.)
||
|Pierre Paradis
|-
|bgcolor=whitesmoke|Chambly
|
|Julie Tremblay
||
|Bertrand St-Arnaud
|
|Martin Trudeau
|
|Anne Poussard
|
|Martin Laramée
|
|Nicholas Lescarbeau (Green)
Daniel Nicol (PC)
||
|Bertrand St-Arnaud
|-
|bgcolor=whitesmoke|Granby
|
|Guy Gaudord
|
|Luc Perron
||
|François Bonnardel
|
|Éric Bédard
|
|Jocelyn Beaudoin
|
|Francine St-Onge (CC)
Stéphane Gagné (PC)
Stéphane Deschamps (PN)
||
|François BonnardelShefford
|-
|bgcolor=whitesmoke|Iberville
|
|Alain Ménard
||
|Marie Bouillé
|
|Claire Samson
|
|Myriam-Zaa Normandin
|
|Claude Chagnon
|
|Marie-France Allard (Green)
||
|Marie Bouillé
|-
|bgcolor=whitesmoke|Richelieu
|
|Alain Plante
||
|Élaine Zakaïb
|
|Jean-Bernard Émond
|
|Marie-Ève Mathieu
|
|Michaël Rocheleau
|
|
||
|Sylvain Simard
|-
|bgcolor=whitesmoke|Saint-Hyacinthe
|
|Louise Arpin
||
|Émilien Pelletier
|
|Pierre Schetagne
|
|Richard Gingras
|
|Jérôme Saint-Amand
|
|Isabelle Leclerc (PC)
Thomas Gagné (QCU)
Alexandre Bruneau (ÉA)
Lise Gaudette (PUN)
||
|Émilien Pelletier
|-
|bgcolor=whitesmoke|Saint-Jean
|
|Martin Massé
||
|Dave Turcotte
|
|Yvan Berthelot
|
|Carole Lusignan
|
|Félix Lemaire
|
|Carmyn Girard (PC)
François Mailly (QCU)
Yvon Sylva Aubé (PI)
||
|Dave Turcotte
|-
|bgcolor=whitesmoke|Verchères
|
|Maxime St-Onge
||
|Stéphane Bergeron
|
|Chantal Soucy
|
|Marie-Thérèse Toutant
|
|Diane Massicotte
|
|Mario Geoffrion (CC)
Steven Terranova (Ind.)
||
|Stéphane Bergeron
|}

South Shore

|-
|bgcolor=whitesmoke|Beauharnois
|
|Lyse Lemieux
||
|Guy Leclair
|
|Michel Drouin
|
|Pierre-Paul St-Onge
|
|Jérémie Poupart Montpetit
|
|Bruno Auclair (Green)
Lynne Mimeault (PC)
Matthieu Bonin (Ind.)
Sylvain Larocque (Ind./nd)
||
|Guy Leclair
|-
|bgcolor=whitesmoke|Châteauguay
||
|Pierre Moreau
|
|Maryse Perreault
|
|Denis Leftakis
|
|Xavier P.-Laberge
|
|Nicolas Dionne
|
|Denis Côté (Green)
Jean-Paul Pellerin (PC)
||
|Pierre Moreau
|-
|bgcolor=whitesmoke|Huntingdon
||
|Stéphane Billette
|
|Gaétan Arel
|
|Claire IsaBelle
|
|Carmen Labelle
|
|Éric Paré
|
|Nicholas Roach (Green)
Antoine-Marie Bourdon (CC)
Maxime Collette (PC)
Steven Gomory (QCU)
||
|Stéphane Billette
|-
|bgcolor=whitesmoke|La Pinière
||
|Fatima Houda-Pepin
|
|Pierre O. Thibert
|
|François Lemay
|
|Johane Beaupré
|
|Mylaine Larocque
|
|Marc-André Beauchemin (Green)
Claude Chalhoub (PC)
Serge Patenaude (ML)
Sean Connolly-Boutin (QCU)
||
|Fatima Houda-Pepin
|-
|bgcolor=whitesmoke|Laporte
||
|Nicole Ménard
|
|Simon Bélanger
|
|Donald LeBlanc
|
|Michèle St-Denis
|
|Linda Dupuis
|
|Camil Lambert (PC)
||
|Nicole Ménard
|-
|bgcolor=whitesmoke|La Prairie
|
|Lucie F. Roussel
|
|Pierre Langlois
||
|Stéphane Le Bouyonnec
|
|Yohan Perron
|
|Jean-Pierre Gouin
|
|Kevin Murphy (Green)
Adrian Ahsly Gutierrez (CC)
Monique Roy-Verville (PC)
Normand Chouinard (ML)
||
|François Rebello
|-
|bgcolor=whitesmoke|Marie-Victorin
|
|Farida Chemmakh
||
|Bernard Drainville
|
|Simon Jolin-Barrette
|
|Carl Lévesque
|
|Olivier Chauvin
|
|Mathieu Yargeau (Green)
Jean Baillargeon (CC)
Yves Ménard (PI)
||
|Bernard Drainville
|-
|bgcolor=whitesmoke|Montarville
|
|Nicole Girard
|
|Monique Richard
||
|Nathalie Roy
|
|David Fortin Côté
|
|Luc Lapierre-Pelletier
|
|Dominique Robitaille (Green)
Claude Leclair (PC)
||
|Monique RichardMarguerite-D'Youville
|-
|bgcolor=whitesmoke|Sanguinet
|
|Jocelyne Bates
||
|Alain Therrien
|
|François Rebello
|
|Frédéric Nadeau
|
|Keven Rousseau
|
|André Martel (PC)
Hélène Héroux (ML)
Martin Mc Neil (Ind.)
|colspan=2|new district
|-
|bgcolor=whitesmoke|Soulanges
||
|Lucie Charlebois
|
|André Bouthillier
|
|Mario Gagnier
|
|Andrée Bessette
|
|Frédéric Roy
|
|Patricia Domingos (Ind.)
||
|Lucie Charlebois
|-
|bgcolor=whitesmoke|Taillon
|
|Marie-Ève Pelletier
||
|Marie Malavoy
|
|Pierre Cimoné
|
|Manon Blanchard
|
|Julien-Alexandre Bilodeau
|
|Carole Mainville Bériault (Green)
Marie-Noelle Mondoux-Lemoine (CC)
Normand Fournier (ML)
Robert Morin (Ind.)
||
|Marie Malavoy
|-
|bgcolor=whitesmoke|Vachon
|
|Linda Langlois Saulnier
||
|Martine Ouellet
|
|Jean-François Roberge
|
|Sébastien Robert
|
|Sylvain Gauthier
|
|Pierre-André Beauchemin (Green)
Marc Joseph (CC)
||
|Martine Ouellet
|-
|bgcolor=whitesmoke|Vaudreuil
||
|Yvon Marcoux
|
|Kim Comeau
|
|Martin Legault
|
|Marc-André Pilon
|
|Julien Bédard
|
|Julien Leclerc (Green)
Étienne Ouellet (QCU)
||
|Yvon Marcoux
|}

See also
 39th Quebec Legislature
 Politics of Quebec
 List of premiers of Quebec
 List of leaders of the Official Opposition (Quebec)
 National Assembly of Quebec
 Timeline of Quebec history
 Political parties in Quebec

Footnotes

References

External links
Web site of Québec’s Chief Electoral Officer
Elections Quebec web site for this election
Official results
Quebec Politique.com
Election Almanac – Quebec Provincial Election 2012

Elections in Quebec
Quebec 40
General election
Quebec general election